Non-specific interstitial pneumonia (NSIP) is a form of idiopathic interstitial pneumonia.

Symptoms

Symptoms include cough, difficulty breathing, and fatigue.

Causes

It has been suggested that idiopathic nonspecific interstitial pneumonia has an autoimmune mechanism, and is a possible complication of undifferentiated connective tissue disease; however, not enough research has been done at this time to find a cause. Patients with NSIP will often have other unrelated lung diseases like COPD or emphysema, along with other auto-immune disorders.

Diagnosis
A full clinical diagnosis can only be made from a lung biopsy of the tissue, fully best performed by a VATS, done by a cardio-thoracic surgeon. Some pulmonologists may first attempt a bronchoscopy; however, this frequently fails to give a full or correct diagnosis.

Lung biopsies performed on patients with NSIP reveal two different disease patterns – cellular and fibrosing – which are associated with different prognoses. The cellular pattern displays chronic inflammation with minimal fibrosis. The fibrosing pattern displays interstitial fibrosis with various inflammation levels. Both patterns are uniform and lack the prominent fibroblastic foci that are found in other types of idiopathic interstitial pneumonia.

Treatment 
Commonly used drugs include prednisone, imuran, and cellcept. For active cases of pneumonia for these patients, Levaquin is a commonly used antibiotic. Almost all patients with NSIP will be on oxygen.

Prognosis

The fibrosing pattern of NSIP has a five-year survival rate of 86% to 92%, while the cellular pattern of NSIP has a 100% five-year survival rate. Patients with NSIP (whether cellular or fibrosing), have a better prognosis than those with usual interstitial pneumonia (UIP).

References

External links 

Pneumonia